Needmore, Kentucky may refer to the following unincorporated communities:

Needmore, Ballard County, Kentucky
Needmore, Boyle County, Kentucky
Needmore, Caldwell County, Kentucky
Needmore, Owen County, Kentucky
Frances, Kentucky, also called Needmore